Leonello Casucci (1885–1975) was an Italian composer.

Casucci was born in Pistoia, Tuscany in 1885 and he's best known for having composed the music of the famous 1929 hit song Schöner Gigolo, armer Gigolo in 1928, with lyrics in German by Julius Brammer in 1924, translated to "Just a Gigolo" into English by Irving Caesar. 
Italian version of the lyrics were published in 1930 by Enrico Frati with the title Gigolò. Casucci died in Desenzano del Garda, Lombardy in 1975, at the age of 89.

References 

1885 births
1975 deaths
Italian songwriters
Male songwriters
20th-century Italian male musicians